Bonţeşti may refer to several villages in Romania:

 Bonţeşti, a village in Gurahonț Commune, Arad County
 Bonţeşti, a village in Cârligele Commune, Vrancea County